Michaelus is a genus of butterflies in the family Lycaenidae.
The members (species) of this genus are found in the Neotropical realm.

External links

Funet Taxonomy Distribution

Eumaeini
Lycaenidae of South America
Lycaenidae genera